Atopia is a Canadian production company and film distributor.

Atopia may also refer to:

 Atopia, a 2001 book by Helmut Willke
 Atopia, a 2019 book of poetry by Sandra Simonds

See also
 The Atopia Chronicles, a 2012 novel by Matthew Mather
 Atopy (philosophy), the ineffability of things or emotions that are seldom experienced